Han Win Aung (born 17 December 1986) is a footballer from Burma, and a defender for the Myanmar national football team.

He currently plays for Kanbawza in Myanmar National League.

References

1984 births
Living people
Burmese footballers
Myanmar international footballers
Kanbawza F.C. players
Association football defenders